Martin Charles Jischke (JIS-key) (born August 7, 1941) is a prominent American higher-education administrator and advocate, and was the tenth president of Purdue University.

Dr. Jischke has served as chairman and board member of the National Association of State Universities and Land-Grant Colleges, and as a board member of the American Council on Education, National Merit Scholarship Corporation, and the Kellogg Commission on the Future of State and Land-Grant Universities. He has also served as a board member for Kerr McGee Corporation,  Wabash National Corporation, and Duke Realty.

He was the founding president of the Global Consortium of Higher Education and Research for Agriculture, and is also on the boards of directors of the Association of American Universities and the American Council on Competitiveness.

Personal background
Martin Jischke was born in Chicago, the son of a grocer, and graduated from Proviso High School in Maywood, Illinois, a suburb on Chicago's west side. In 1963 he earned his bachelor's degree in physics with honors from Illinois Institute of Technology, where he currently serves on the board of trustees. While at Illinois Institute of Technology he became a member of Delta Tau Delta International Fraternity. He received his master's and doctoral degrees in aeronautics and astronautics from the Massachusetts Institute of Technology in 1968. He married his wife, Patricia "Patty" Fowler Jischke in 1970. They have two children, Charles, a photographer living in West Lafayette, Indiana and Marian, an engineer living in Indianapolis.

Career

Science

Dr. Jischke, a specialist in fluid dynamics, has extensive expertise in heat transfer, fluid mechanics, aerodynamics and high-speed aircraft and spacecraft. He is co-editor of one book and the author or co-author of 31 journal publications and 21 major technical reports. He has given more than 50 major technical presentations and lectures, and has held research fellowships with NASA and the Donald W. Douglas Laboratory. He has received research grants from the National Science Foundation, U.S. Air Force, NASA, National Institutes of Health, National Severe Storms Laboratory and the Nuclear Regulatory Commission. He served as a White House fellow and special assistant to the U.S. Secretary of Transportation from 1975 to 1976. Dr. Jischke is a fellow of the American Association for the Advancement of Science and the American Institute of Aeronautics and Astronautics. In 2006, Jischke was appointed to the President's Council on Science and Technology|Council of Advisers on Science and Technology.

Administration

Dr. Jischke was a member the faculty of the University of Oklahoma's School of Aerospace, Mechanical and Nuclear Engineering for 17 years, and also served as  director of the school. During his time at the university, he was the principal advisor to 21 thesis students. He served as Chair of the Faculty Senate during the 1974–75 academic year, dean of the College of Engineering from 1981 to 1986, and in 1985 Dr. Jischke was named the university's interim president.

In 1986 Dr. Jischke was named chancellor of the University of Missouri–Rolla. Success in that role led him to the presidency of Iowa State University in 1991.  He raised money for scholarships. Dr. Jischke also set records for private fundraising at the university each year he was there, surpassing $100 million annually. The Martin C. Jischke Honors Building at Iowa State is named after him.

Awards

Dr. Jischke has received a number of prestigious awards for his accomplishments in science and education. His is a recipient of the American Society for Engineering Education Centennial Medallion and the Illinois Institute of Technology Professional Achievement Award. He also received the Ukraine Medal of Merit from Ukraine's president for outstanding service by a foreign national. The Illinois Institute of Technology and the National Agricultural University of Ukraine have both awarded him honorary doctoral degrees.

He is an honorary member of Mortar Board National College Senior Honor Society, having been tapped by the Barbara Cook chapter at Purdue University in 2006.

In 2013, Jischke's alma mater, Illinois Institute of Technology, awarded him with its annual Alumni Medal, the alumni association's highest honor.

Purdue University

On August 14, 2000, Jischke became the tenth president of Purdue University, succeeding Steven C. Beering, who stepped down after 17 years as Purdue's president. From the beginning of his administration, Jischke established the goal of "making a great university into a preeminent university."

To accomplish this goal, Jischke and the Purdue University Board of Trustees developed a strategic plan for the university, proposed sweeping changes, and introduced ambitious fundraising and construction agendas. The scope of the plan extended beyond the university campus, to the state of Indiana at large. Jischke and the trustees saw a stronger Purdue leading an economic resurgence for the entire state.

The five-year strategic plan was adopted in November 2001. The plan called for data-driven decision making, focusing on collecting data on various performance benchmarks for comparison with peer institutions. Jischke also advocated steps to improve diversity, expand interdisciplinary research, add 300 new faculty positions, and engage government and business leaders to advance economic development. One of the most visible expressions of his vision is Discovery Park, a $100 million multidisciplinary research and entrepreneurial complex on Purdue's West Lafayette campus.

Jischke also led the way in the "Campaign for Purdue," a $1.5 billion fund-raising operation, launched in September 2002 in support of the strategic plan. The campaign designated $200 million for student scholarships and fellowships, $200 million to attract and retain a quality faculty, $200 million for programs and centers, $600 million for facilities and equipment and $100 million in unrestricted funds. The plan was the largest such fundraising campaign in the history of higher education in Indiana. Jischke also focused on building alumni support and creating educational partnerships within the state.

In October 2004, Jischke testified before the United States Senate Committee on Foreign Relations on the value of international students, their decline in U.S. university enrollment since the September 11 attacks, and recommendations for visa policy reform.

On August 4, 2006, Jischke announced he would be stepping down from the president's post at the end of the 2006–07 fiscal year.  He stated he would be taking a year off from public life at that time.

On May 7, 2007, the Purdue University Board of Trustees announced the appointment of France A. Córdova to succeed Jischke as the university's 11th president effective July 16, 2007.

On May 12, 2007, Jischke was awarded an honorary doctorate degree from Purdue University's College of Engineering. In June 2007, Jischke was awarded the university's first Neil Armstrong Medal of Excellence by Armstrong himself, along with the Sagamore of the Wabash, the highest honor from the governor of Indiana.

References

External links
 Oral history interview 2007 – Indiana University
 Oral history interview 2006 – Purdue University
 

1941 births
Living people
Missouri University of Science and Technology faculty
People from Chicago
Presidents of Iowa State University
Presidents of Purdue University